Theophylactus served as Greek Patriarch of Alexandria sometime between the 7th and 8th centuries (exact dates are not known).

8th-century Patriarchs of Alexandria